The Karuppanadhi Dam  is located at the foothills of Western Ghats built across the Karuppanadhi river near Chokkampatti, in the Tirunelveli district of Tamil Nadu, southern India. It provides water for irrigation to the  region of Kadayanallur Taluk.

History
The dam construction was started in 1971 and it took six years to complete. The dam was opened in the year of 1977.

Dimensions and capacity

 Height Above Lowest Foundation - 34m
 Length of Dam - 899m
 Volume Content of Dam - 10 mcube
 Gross Capacity of Reservoir - 10 mcube
 Effective Capacity of Reservoir - 10 mcube
 Estimated Cost 27.35 Million Rupees
 Project Integration Potential - 1161 Hectares
 Cultivable Command Area - 1161 Hectares

Maintenance
Karuppanadhi Dam is maintained by Water Resources Department which in turn managed by the Tamil Nadu Public Works Department.

Transportation

By Road:The dam is situated at 13 km from Kadayanallur, and 82 km from Tirunelveli.

By Train:The nearest railway station is Kadayanallur station. Kadayanallur station is well connected with Madurai and Chennai.

By Air:The nearest airport is Tiruvandrum  which is 120 km away from the Dam. Air connectivity is available from Chennai. International connectivity is available to Tiruvandrum.

References

Dams in Tamil Nadu
Dams completed in 1977
1977 establishments in Tamil Nadu
20th-century architecture in India